Rhomboceros is a genus of moths belonging to the subfamily Tortricinae of the family Tortricidae.

Species
Rhomboceros acrographa (Diakonoff, 1953)
Rhomboceros barbata Diakonoff, 1953
Rhomboceros chalepa Diakonoff, 1984
Rhomboceros ethica Diakonoff, 1953
Rhomboceros homogama (Meyrick, 1910)
Rhomboceros iridescens Diakonoff, 1953
Rhomboceros nodicornis Meyrick, 1910
Rhomboceros pulverulenta Diakonoff, 1953
Rhomboceros rosacea Diakonoff, 1953
Rhomboceros thelea (Diakonoff, 1953)

See also
List of Tortricidae genera

References

External links
Tortricid.net

Tortricidae genera
Epitymbiini